Flowers in the Attic is a 1979 Gothic novel by V. C. Andrews. It is the first book in the Dollanganger Series, and was followed by Petals on the Wind, If There Be Thorns, Seeds of Yesterday, Garden of Shadows, Christopher's Diary: Secrets of Foxworth, Christopher's Diary: Echoes of Dollanganger and Christopher's Diary: Secret Brother. The novel is written in the first-person, from the point of view of Cathy Dollanganger. It was twice adapted into films in 1987 and 2014. The book was extremely popular, selling over forty million copies world-wide.

Plot
In 1957, the Dollanganger family—father Christopher, mother Corinne, 14-year-old Chris, 12-year-old Cathy, and 5-year-old twins Carrie and Cory—live an idyllic life in Gladstone, Pennsylvania, until Christopher Sr. is killed in a car accident, leaving Corinne deep in debt with no means to support her children.

On the verge of their home being foreclosed, Corinne reveals to the children that as a young woman, her marriage to Christopher so offended her multimillionaire father Malcolm Foxworth that he disinherited her. Now the elderly Malcolm is dying of heart disease, and Corinne intends to return to her childhood home of Foxworth Hall in Virginia to win back her father's affection in time to be reinstated into his will. Because Malcolm is unaware that Corinne had children by her marriage to Christopher, the children must hide in a secluded upstairs room of the enormous Foxworth Hall until Corinne can break the news to her father. She assures the children that they will only be in the room for a few days.

At Foxworth Hall, Corinne's mother (called only "the grandmother") locks the children in a bedroom connected to the house's large attic. The grandmother forces Corinne to reveal to her children that the reason for her disinheritance was that Christopher was Malcolm's younger half-brother, and thus Corinne's half-uncle, and that the children are the products of incest. The grandmother believes the children are "the Devil's spawn" and is obsessed with the idea of incest, forbidding all contact between opposite sexes, while prohibiting the children from making noise or opening the room's windows. Only in the attic are they free to play.

Cathy and Chris attempt to make the best of the situation by decorating the attic with paper flowers to create an imaginary garden for the twins. The grandmother comes every morning with a picnic basket filled with the day's food and interrogates the children about their modesty and piety, questions the children are too innocent to fully understand. Initially their mother visits multiple times per day, bringing toys and gifts, but over time, her visits grow sporadic. After months have passed, Cathy and Chris confront her, as she promised they would be freed in only a few days. Corinne finally confesses that they must remain in the room until their grandfather dies.

A year later, Cathy and Chris have both entered puberty, while the twins are stunted from inadequate nutrition and lack of sunlight. With no other outlets, Cathy and Chris develop a romantic and sexual attraction toward each other, though they do their best to deny their feelings. The grandmother catches Chris staring at a half-dressed Cathy and punishes the children by cutting off their food supply for over two weeks, while the children pray their mother will reappear in time to save them. On the verge of starvation, Cathy and Chris decide to escape with the twins to find help. Before they can go through with the plan, the grandmother begins bringing food again, including a rare treat of powdered sugar doughnuts. Soon afterwards, all the children begin to complain of constant minor illness.

Another year passes. After an absence of several months, Corinne visits the children, explaining that she had been on a European honeymoon with her new husband, Bart Winslow. Cathy and Chris are furious, but fear Corinne will abandon them permanently if they confront her.

Realizing that the twins' health is declining, Chris and Cathy decide to escape. Chris creates a wooden skeleton key. Over the next several months, he and Cathy take turns slipping downstairs to their mother's suite to steal cash and jewelry to fund their lives outside. One night, Cathy discovers her sleeping stepfather and kisses him. When Chris learns of the kiss, he rapes Cathy in a fit of jealousy and rage. Afterwards, he is overcome with remorse, while Cathy feels guilty and conflicted about the act due to her love for Chris.

One of the twins, Cory, becomes deathly ill. Cathy begs Corinne to take him to a hospital, but Corinne hesitates. Cathy, enraged, tells her that if she does not act to save Cory's life, Cathy will reveal their existence to the grandfather. Corinne finally takes Cory away, but returns the following morning to inform the children that Cory died of pneumonia. The children are devastated, with Cathy left wondering if Cory's death is God's punishment for her sexual assault from Chris.

Chris resumes stealing from their mother's rooms, only to discover Corinne and Bart have left Foxworth Hall permanently. Eavesdropping on the servants, Chris learns their grandfather died a year ago and that the grandmother has been leaving food contaminated with rat poison in the attic due to a "mouse infestation." Chris connects this with the doughnuts they are being fed and realizes Cory died of arsenic poisoning.

The three remaining children finally leave Foxworth Hall to catch a train to Florida. At the station, Chris reveals he discovered Corinne's inheritance is conditional upon her having no children from her first marriage, and she, rather than the grandmother, was the one who most likely poisoned them. Chris and Cathy decide against contacting the authorities as their main concern is to stay together, but Cathy vows that one day she will make Corinne pay for her crimes.

Characters

 Catherine Leigh "Cathy" Dollanganger: The protagonist and narrator of the novel. Cathy is the second child and older daughter of Christopher and Corinne. She becomes an accomplished ballerina and later a novelist. During their time in the attic, she becomes romantically and sexually attracted to Chris, her brother, and then she falls in love with him.
 Christopher Garland "Chris" Dollanganger, Jr.: Older son and oldest child of Christopher and Corinne. Chris is the older brother of Cathy, Cory, and Carrie. He is an over-achiever and later becomes a doctor. During their time in the attic, he becomes romantically and sexually attracted to Cathy, his sister, and then he falls in love with her.
 Cory Dollanganger: Twin brother of Carrie and younger brother of Cathy and Chris. The "quiet one" of the twins, Cory is introverted but musically talented.  He becomes ill during their time in the attic and dies from arsenic poisoning at the hands of his mother.
 Carrie Dollanganger: Twin sister to Cory and the younger sister of Cathy and Chris. Prior to Cory's death, she is an extroverted girly girl, but after Cory dies, she refuses to speak for months.
 Corinne Dollanganger (née Foxworth): Mother of Chris, Cathy, Cory, and Carrie and widow of Christopher Dollanganger. Eventually becomes an antagonist in the story when she tries to kill her children in order to gain her father's inheritance. She marries her father's attorney, Bart Winslow, later on and loses interest in her children and late husband.
Bartholomew "Bart" Winslow: Second husband of Corrine. He is a trophy husband and marries her, thinking that she does not have any children. Cathy is shocked to discover that he is eight years younger than Corinne.
 Olivia Foxworth (née Winfield): Wife of Malcolm Foxworth. Grandmother of the Dollanganger children. Cousin of John Amos. Olivia and Malcolm are co-antagonists in this book.
 Malcolm Neal Foxworth: Father of Corinne and grandfather of the Dollanganger children. Husband of Olivia. He is described both as having a heart condition and as heartless. He dies during the story, though Chris and Cathy do not learn this until the end. He was also the older half-brother of the children's father.
 Christopher Dollanganger, Sr.: Corinne's first husband; father of the children. He was Malcolm's younger half-brother, making him Corinne's half-uncle. He is described as a wonderful father who could not bear to be separated from his children for longer than five days. He is killed in a car accident on his birthday at the beginning of the book.
 John Amos: A butler to the Foxworth family. Olivia's cousin.  Chris overhears horrible information from him during one of Chris' expeditions to steal from his mother.

Reception
A review in The Washington Post when the book was originally released described the book as “deranged swill” that “may well be the worst book I have ever read”. The retrospective in The Guardian agreed that it is deranged but called it "utterly compelling."

School library bannings
The depiction of incest between an adolescent brother and sister in the novel has led to its being banned in certain areas at different times. Chariho High School in Rhode Island removed it because it contained "offensive passages concerning incest and sexual intercourse." In 1994, it was removed from the Oconee County, Georgia school libraries due to "the filthiness of the material."

Awards
In 1993, Flowers in the Attic was awarded the Secondary BILBY Award. In 2003 the book was listed on the BBC's The Big Read poll of the UK's 200 "best-loved novels."

Adaptations
In 1987, the book was adapted into a film of the same name starring Louise Fletcher, Victoria Tennant, Kristy Swanson, and Jeb Stuart Adams and directed by Jeffrey Bloom.

A second adaptation was released on January 18, 2014, on the Lifetime network starring Heather Graham as Corrine and Ellen Burstyn as the Grandmother, with Kiernan Shipka as Cathy, Mason Dye as Christopher, and directed by Deborah Chow. The film received mixed reviews, but critics praised Ellen Burstyn's performance.

The book was adapted into a stage play by V. C. Andrews's ghost writer, Andrew Neiderman, in the form of an e-book and was published by Pocket Star. The stage play was released in October 2014 and is 80 pages in length. In August 2015, the stage play received its world premiere production in New Orleans, Louisiana. The play, which received positive reviews, was produced by See 'Em On Stage: A Production Company and was directed by Christopher Bentivegna.

In 2022, the Lifetime network released a television limited series called Flowers in the Attic: The Origin, starring Kelsey Grammer and Kate Mulgrew. The four episode miniseries is a prequel that focuses on Olivia Foxworth, and is largely based on Garden of Shadows, the fifth novel of the Dollangager series.

Historical basis
In her original pitch letter to her publisher, Andrews claimed that the story behind the novel was "not truly fiction," leading to long-standing rumors that the novel may have been based on true events. For many years, there was no evidence to support this claim, and the book was passed off as fiction. Nonetheless, the official V. C. Andrews website claims to have contacted one of Andrews' relatives. This unidentified relative claimed Flowers in the Attic was loosely based on a faintly similar account. While at the "University of Virginia hospital for treatment...she developed a crush on her young doctor. He and his siblings had been locked away in the attic for over 6 years to preserve the family wealth."

References

1979 American novels
American gothic novels
Novels by V. C. Andrews
American young adult novels
American novels adapted into films
American novels adapted into plays
Novels set in Virginia
BILBY Award-winning works
Child abuse in fiction
Incest in fiction
1979 debut novels
First-person narrative novels
Obscenity controversies in literature